A Populist is a believer in the rights, wisdom, or virtues of the common people.

Populist may also refer to:

 Populist Caucus, a Democratic Congressional caucus founded by Bruce Braley of Iowa
 Populist Party (United States), an alternate name of  the People's Party, a major political party in the United States in the late 19th century
 The Progressive Populist, a newspaper founded in 1995 based in Storm Lake, Iowa

See also 
Narodnik, a trend of agrarian socialism in late Tsarist Russia
Populist Party (disambiguation), groups worldwide